Dolors is a Catalan feminine given name, a cognate of Dolores.

People with the name
 Dolors Aleu i Riera (1857–1913), Spanish physician
 Dolors Bassa (born 1959), Spanish politician, educator, and psychopedagogist
 Dolors Bramon (born 1943), Spanish philologist and historian
 Dolors Lamarca (born 1943), Spanish librarian and philologist
 Dolors Monserdà (1845–1919), Spanish writer
 Dolors Montserrat (born 1973), Spanish lawyer and politician
 Dolors Terradas (born 1949), Spanish teacher and politician
 Dolors Vázquez Aznar (1955–2014), Spanish painter
 Dolors Vives Rodon (1909–2007), Spanish aviator

See also
 Dolor (disambiguation)

References

Catalan feminine given names